Tizvione is a village in the Manicaland province of Zimbabwe, Africa.

Populated places in Manicaland Province